The Magician (Spanish:El Mago) is a 1949 Mexican comedy film directed by Miguel M. Delgado and starring Cantinflas, Leonora Amar and José Baviera.  The film tells the story of lookalike hired from an agency to take the place of a magician who has gone on holiday.

The film's sets were designed by the art director Gunther Gerszo.

Cast
 Cantinflas as Cantinflas  
 Leonora Amar as Jeanette 
 José Baviera as Mago Krishnar  
 Ernesto Finance as Makazar 
 Alejandro Cobo as Jefe de secuestradores  
 Pepe Martínez as Ministro de Arichi  
 Miguel Manzano as Serafín  
 Amparo Arozamena as Mujer de Pedro, clienta de mago  
 Rafael Icardo as Ministro de Arichi  
 Rudy del Moral as Ruperto  
 Julián de Meriche 
 Olga Chaviano as Bailarina 
 Jorge Mondragon 
 Óscar Pulido as Jefe de la secreta  
 Victorio Blanco as Asesino turbante (uncredited)
 Guillermo Calles as Asesino turbante (uncredited)
 Roberto Corell as Maraja de Pentanal (uncredited)
 Eduardo Finance (uncredited)
 Lidia Franco (uncredited)
 Ramiro Gamboa as Reportero (uncredited)
 Enrique García Álvarez as Señor director (uncredited)
 María Gentil Arcos as Clienta de Krishnar (uncredited)
 Leonor Gómez as Vendedora de comida (uncredited)
 Queta Lavat as Secretaria (uncredited)
 Cecilia Leger as Invitada a cena (uncredited)
 Margarito Luna as Secuestrador (uncredited)
 Paco Martínez as Doctor (uncredited)
 Álvaro Matute as Secuestrador (uncredited)
 Pepe Nava as Fakir Birman (uncredited)
 Manuel Noriega as Profesor escuela, cliente mago (uncredited)
 José Ortiz de Zárate as Doctor (uncredited)
 Sonia Ramos (uncredited)
 Humberto Rodríguez as Ministro de Arichi (uncredited)
 Sergio Rodríguez (uncredited)
 María Valdealde as Señora del Moral, clienta de Krishnar (uncredited)
 Armando Velasco as Empleado hotel (uncredited)
 Acela Vidaurri (uncredited)
 Burdette Zea (uncredited)

References

Bibliography 
 Pilcher, Jeffrey M. Cantinflas and the Chaos of Mexican Modernity. Rowman & Littlefield, 2001.

External links 
 

1949 films
1949 comedy films
Mexican comedy films
1940s Spanish-language films
Films directed by Miguel M. Delgado
Mexican black-and-white films
1940s Mexican films